Stuart Edward Leary (30 April 1933 – 21 August 1988) was a South African sportsman who played professional football as a centre-forward and cricket as an all-rounder.

Leary started his career with Cape Town side Clyde before moving to English side Charlton Athletic in 1950 along with team-mate Eddie Firmani. He was one of a number of South Africans to move to The Valley in this era. After making his debut in 1951, he became a prolific goal-scorer scoring a record number of league goals for the club. Despite being South African born, he appeared for the England under-23 team but was prevented from representing the full team by the Football Association who banned non-English-born players from representing the national team. During his period of National Service he served with the Royal Air Force. In all, he made 403 appearances for the Addicks, scoring 163. After failing to agree a new contract, he joined Queens Park Rangers in 1962 and remained there until his retirement in 1966.

Leary also had a long and successful career as a first-class cricketer for Kent County Cricket Club between 1951 and 1971. He scored 16,517 runs at a batting average of 31 and took 146 wickets at an average of 34.

His body was discovered on Table Mountain in South Africa on 23 August 1988. It was believed he had died two days earlier after taking his own life.

References

External links

1933 births
1988 suicides
South African soccer players
Queens Park Rangers F.C. players
Charlton Athletic F.C. players
English Football League players
South African cricketers
Kent cricketers
Combined Services cricketers
Soccer players from Cape Town
White South African people
Marylebone Cricket Club cricketers
England under-23 international footballers
London XI players
Association football forwards
Alumni of Sea Point High School
Suicides in South Africa
Sportspeople from Cape Town